Iván Zamora Esquivel (born 11 January 1996) is a Mexican footballer who plays as a midfielder for Escorpiones.

References

External links

Iván Zamora at Ascenso MX

1996 births
Living people
Association football midfielders
Footballers from the State of Mexico
People from Toluca
Deportivo Toluca F.C. players
Atlante F.C. footballers
Potros UAEM footballers
Liga MX players
Ascenso MX players
Mexican footballers